Kris Kwapis is a baroque trumpet and cornetto player. She has played with several period instrument ensembles including New York Collegium, Tafelmusik Baroque Orchestra and Boston Early Music Festival, making music with conductors such as Andrew Parrott, Richard Egarr and Masaaki Suzuki.

Kris was a founding member and Artistic Director of Spiritus Collective, an ensemble dedicated to performing rarely heard brass music of the 17th century.  She was a student of Armando Ghitalla on modern trumpet, with a BM and MM in trumpet performance from the University of Michigan, holds a DMA in historical performance from Stony Brook University, and lectures on historical brass performance practice with recent appearances at the Metropolitan Museum of Art, University of Wyoming, University of Minnesota-Duluth, Pacific Lutheran University and Rutgers University.

Kris is a faculty member at Indiana University’s Jacobs School of Music Early Music Institute (teaching cornetto and baroque trumpet), and teaches at the new early music program led by Stephen Stubbs at Seattle's Cornish School of the Arts.

References 

 http://www.cornish.edu/music/faculty/kris_kwapis/
 http://earlymusicguild.wordpress.com/2009/08/24/an-interview-with-kris-kwapis-emgs-marketing-and-development-coordinator/
 http://www.foundling.org/kris.html
 https://web.archive.org/web/20120412034546/http://www.tenetnyc.com/musicians/kris-kwapis/
 Interview by Tigran Arakelyan

External links 
 http://www.kriskwapis.com/

Year of birth missing (living people)
Living people
American male trumpeters
University of Michigan School of Music, Theatre & Dance alumni
21st-century trumpeters
21st-century American male musicians